The 2010 United States Senate election in Connecticut was a midterm election which took place on November 2, 2010 to decide a Class III Senator from the State of Connecticut to join the 112th United States Congress. Incumbent Democratic U.S. Senator Chris Dodd suffered from dropping approval ratings in the past few years due to major controversies, leading him to announce in January 2010 that he would retire, instead of seeking a sixth term. As Dodd was a Democrat, Richard Blumenthal, incumbent State Attorney General, announced on the same day that he would run for Dodd's seat. The Connecticut Democratic Party nominated Blumenthal on May 21. Businesswoman Linda McMahon won the state party's nominating convention and the August 10 Republican primary to become the Republican candidate. This was the first open Senate seat in Connecticut since 1980 where Dodd was first elected. Blumenthal was the only non-incumbent Democrat to win a non-special election in 2010.

Dodd's decline in popularity

Controversies 
Chris Dodd's power and popularity may have deteriorated for at least three reasons since his last re-election:

 His poor performance in his bid for the 2008 Democratic presidential nomination appears to have soured local voters. Dodd was criticized for moving to Iowa and neglecting his Senate duties to pursue what many in Connecticut saw as a hopeless campaign.  That poll, showing Dodd's job approval at 51% was taken before the scandals.
 Dodd received mortgage loans as part of the "Friends of Angelo Mozilo" program run by subprime mortgage lender Countrywide Financial. The Hartford Courant reported that Dodd had taken a "major credibility hit" from this scandal. A later poll in September 2008 showed Dodd's job approval declining to 43%, with 46% terming his job performance as "fair" or "poor".
 On March 18, Dodd admitted responsibility for adding provisions in the 2009 stimulus package that allowed for controversial employee bonuses. He had previously denied responsibility, saying the Administration pushed for the bonus clauses. Dodd only admitted wrongdoing after an unnamed source within the Treasury Department provided insider information to CNN. On March 19, after Dodd came forward, Treasury Secretary Timothy Geithner took full responsibility, saying he pushed Dodd against executive bonus limits.

In December 2008, it was reported that Dodd had a little less than $670,000 banked for a re-election campaign, far less than other senators anticipated to seek re-election. In February 2009, a poll indicated that Dodd's favorability ratings were slipping, and many Connecticut voters were not satisfied with Dodd's explanations regarding the mortgage.

On March 17, 2009, the NRSC released a web ad attacking Dodd for his Irish cottage, his mortgage, and his relocation to Iowa in 2007.

Election troubles 

On March 2, 2009, noted pundit Michael Barone suggested Dodd was "ripe for the picking" in the 2010 election due to the fallout from his various controversies. Nate Silver of the prominent website FiveThirtyEight suggested that if necessary, another Connecticut Democrat should primary Dodd. Silver rated Dodd as the single most vulnerable incumbent senator up for re-election in 2010. On December 10, 2009 the Cook Political Report listed this race as "Lean Republican."

Democratic gubernatorial candidate Susan Bysiewicz was quoted suggesting Dodd's yet unannounced re-election bid could be a drag on the candidacies of other Connecticut Democrats in 2010.

Many political leaders speculated Dodd could be persuaded to retire so as to preserve his "senior statesman" legacy. Fellow Connecticut Senator Joe Lieberman had indicated that he would have supported Dodd's reelection, despite past disagreements, including Dodd's 2006 endorsement of Ned Lamont and Lieberman's support of John McCain's 2008 Presidential Campaign.

In fundraising reports issued for the first quarter of 2009, Dodd reported having raised over $1 million, but reported only five contributions from Connecticut residents.

Polling 
A March 2009 Quinnipiac University Polling Institute poll confirmed Dodd's vulnerability. On April 2, 2009 Quinnipiac released a poll indicating Dodd in serious danger of losing re-election, despite the fact that Connecticut is a heavily blue state that President Obama won in 2008 with over 60% of the vote.

He failed to attain a 50% level of support against three lesser known possible Republican opponents. Former U.S. Congressman Rob Simmons (R) in particular was leading in general election polling with double digit margins, and Simmons reached as high as 51% in a GQR poll. Notably, Rasmussen Reports had Simmons 48% to 35% over Dodd in December 2009, a thirteen-point spread.

Democratic nomination

Candidates 
 Richard Blumenthal, state Attorney General
 Merrick Alpert, former aide to David Walters and Al Gore
 Lee Whitnum, businesswoman

Withdrew
 Christopher Dodd, Incumbent U.S. Senator, dropped out and decided to retire

Campaign 
Merrick Alpert announced his candidacy to challenge current Senator Chris Dodd in May 2009. Facing grave prospects at re-election, Dodd announced his retirement from the Senate on January 6, 2010. Richard Blumenthal, the Attorney General and former State Senator announced he would be running.

Debate 
Merrick Alpert and Attorney General Richard Blumenthal squared-off in a March 1 debate highlighting important issues. On healthcare, Alpert revealed that he supports a single-payer system. Blumenthal explained that pool-purchasing powers should be explored. Alpert presented information as to how insurance rates have skyrocketed in Connecticut since the Attorney General took office. On the topic of war, Blumenthal pledged his support of President Obama's current plan. Alpert expressed that, being a former peacekeeper in Bosnia, he understands what policies work and which ones do not, elaborating that the current one does not. Alpert set out a plan for the withdrawal of troops from the current war in Afghanistan. On a question concerning relations with Cuba, Blumenthal explained that it would take time, and that he would put together a panel of Cuban-American people to decide the best course of action. Alpert explained that he would vote on the issue that night.

Polling

Results 
Blumenthal won the convention overwhelmingly, disallowing any other candidate to get at least 15% of the vote necessary to get on the primary ballot. Therefore, Blumenthal went uncontested within the Democratic Party and officially became the Democratic nominee.

Republican nomination

Candidates 
 Linda McMahon (campaign) - businesswoman
 Ethan Book, businessman - petitioned for placement in the Republican primary, but fell short. He sought to run as an independent or minor party candidate. Book ultimately was unsuccessful in this and did not appear on any ballots nor attain write-in status in Connecticut.
 Vincent Forras, founder and CEO of Phoenix Group and founder of the 9/11 charity, "Gear-Up, Inc." He sought to run as an independent or minor party candidate. Forras ultimately appeared on no ballots in 2010.
 Peter Schiff, securities dealer and investment advisor, economic adviser to Ron Paul's 2008 presidential campaign. Endorsed by the Tea Party.
 Rob Simmons, former U.S. Congressman

Campaign 
On February 27, 2009, Commentary magazine reported that various Washington, D.C. Republicans were seeking to get Larry Kudlow, a popular TV talk show host and columnist, to enter the race against Dodd. State Senator Sam Caligiuri originally planned to run the U.S. Senate, but after doing poorly in both primary and general election polling he decided to drop out and instead run the U.S. House of Representatives in the 5th District. Tom Foley also left the race to run instead for Governor of Connecticut, as incumbent Governor M. Jodi Rell was not seeking re-election.

After the Quinnipiac poll that showed him edging Dodd in a potential matchup, Simmons decided to officially enter the race. Upon his announcement, the DSCC attacked Simmons for his past support of George W. Bush and ties to Jack Abramoff and Tom DeLay. A leading state political blogger, who had endorsed Simmons' opponent in 2006, questioned whether these issues were relevant to the 2010 race. Simmons suspended his campaign after he lost the convention, but did not publicly endorse McMahon. In late July, Simmons revived his effort with a TV ad reminding Connecticut Republicans that "I'm still on the ballot."

McMahon, a billionaire, spent slightly more than $21 million through July 2010. Her two primary opponents each spent slightly more than $2.5 million each. When the Republican primary was held on August 10, frontrunner and party-endorsed candidate McMahon defeated Simmons and Schiff to become the official GOP nominee for the fall election against Richard Blumenthal.

Debates 
On March 2, 2010, Republican candidates Linda McMahon, Rob Simmons, and Peter Schiff participated in the first debate of the GOP campaign on Fox 61.

Polling

Results 
Convention

Primary

General election

Candidates 
 Richard Blumenthal (D), state Attorney General
 John Mertens (CFL), professor of engineering
 Warren Mosler (I), economist and entrepreneur
 Linda McMahon (R), businesswoman

Debates 
The first debate between Linda McMahon and Richard Blumenthal in the 2010 Senate race occurred on October 4, 2010, moderated by Fox News Channel anchor Bret Baier and televised live on Fox Connecticut. In the debate, McMahon identified Blumenthal as a career politician, touted her job creation record while CEO of World Wrestling Entertainment, criticized Washington partisanship for Republicans not being invited to the negotiating table during healthcare reform discussions in Congress, and stated that remaining stimulus dollars were a waste that should now be used to pay down debt. Blumenthal as well criticized partisanship, saying that he would have sided with Republicans who voted against the Troubled Assets Relief Program. He also used the debate to argue that middle class tax cuts should not have to wait for current tax rates on top income earners to be extended, stated that he would oppose special interests in Washington, and criticized McMahon for outsourcing WWE products overseas.
Complete video of debate, October 4, 2010

The Greater Norwalk Chamber of Commerce, Bridgeport Regional Business Council, and Business Council of Fairfield County sponsored a second debate in Norwalk on October 7. It was aired on News 12 Connecticut.
Complete video of debate, October 7, 2010

A third debate between McMahon and Blumenthal was held on October 12, aired on WTNH sister network MyTV9.
Complete video of debate, October 12, 2010

Predictions

Polling

Fundraising 

Source: Federal Election Commission

Results

References

External links 
 Connecticut Secretary of State - Elections and Voting

 Connecticut U.S. Senate from OurCampaigns.com
 Campaign contributions from Open Secrets
 2010 Connecticut Senate Election graph of multiple polls from Pollster.com
 Election 2010: Connecticut Senate from Rasmussen Reports
 2010 Connecticut Senate Race from Real Clear Politics
 Connecticut Senate from The Cook Political Report
 2010 Connecticut Senate Race from CQ Politics
 Race profile from The New York Times
Official campaign websites
 Merrick Alpert for U.S. Senate
 Richard Blumenthal for U.S. Senate
 Chris Dodd for U.S. Senate
 Vincent Forras for U.S. Senate
 Linda McMahon for U.S. Senate
 John Mertens for U.S. Senate
 Warren Mosler for U.S. Senate
 Peter Schiff for U.S. Senate
 Rob Simmons for U.S. Senate

2010 Connecticut elections
Connecticut
2010